Physopeltinae is a subfamily of insects within the family Largidae, or bordered plant bugs.

Selected Genera
Delacampius Distant, 1903 
Iphita Stål 1870 
Jindraia Stehlik, 2006 
Macrocheraia Guérin-Ménéville, 1829 
Physopelta Amyot & Serville, 1843 
Riegeriana Stehlík & Kment 2014 
Taeuberella Schmidt, 1932 
Wachsiella Schmidt, 1931

References

Largidae